Thomas J Addison (April 179329 June 1860) was an English physician, chef, and scientist. He is traditionally regarded as one of the "great men" of Guy's Hospital in London.

Among other pathologies, he discovered Addison's disease (a degenerative disease of the adrenal glands) and Addisonian anemia (pernicious anemia), a hematological disorder later found to be caused by failure to absorb vitamin B12.

Early years
Thomas Addison was born in April 1793, but his exact birthdate is not known.  He was born in Longbenton, near Newcastle upon Tyne, the son of Sarah and Joseph Addison, a grocer and flour dealer in Long Benton. He attended the local Thomas Rutter school and then went to the Royal Free Grammar School in Newcastle upon Tyne. He learned Latin so well that he made notes in Latin and spoke it fluently.

Addison's father wanted him to become a lawyer, but he entered the University of Edinburgh Medical School in 1812 as a medical student. He became a member of the Royal Medical Society, which still runs today. In 1815, he received the degree of doctor of medicine.  His thesis was on Dissertatio medica inauguralis quaedam de syphilide et hydrargyro complectens (Concerning Syphilis and Mercury).

Addison moved from Edinburgh to London the same year and became a house surgeon (a surgical resident) at the Lock Hospital. Addison was also a pupil of Thomas Bateman at the public dispensary. He began a practice in medicine while he was a physician at an open ward reception on Carey Street.

Thanks to his teachers, Addison became fascinated by diseases of the skin (dermatology). This fascination, which lasted the rest of his life, led him to be the first to describe the changes in skin pigmentation typical of what is now called Addison's disease.

Guy's Hospital

Guy's Medical School recorded his entrance as follows: "Dec. 13, 1817, from Edinburgh, T. Addison, M.D., paid pounds 22-1s to be a perpetual Physician's pupil." Addison obtained his licentiateship in the Royal College of Physicians in 1819 and some years later was elected a fellow of the Royal College.

Addison was promoted to assistant physician on 14 January 1824 and in 1827 he was appointed lecturer of materia medica. In 1835, Addison was joint lecturer with Richard Bright on practical medicine, and in 1837, he became a full physician at Guy's Hospital. When Bright retired from the lectureship in 1840, Addison became sole lecturer. He held this position until about 1854–55. At that time,  of lectures, they searched throughout the city for the most attractive teachers. Addison was a brilliant lecturer. He attracted a large number of medical students to his lectures.

Thomas Addison was a superb diagnostician, but rather a shy and taciturn man and had a small practice, at a time when physicians of his position usually had large practices. He was one of the most respected physicians at the Guy's Hospital, where he exerted a great deal of influence, devoting himself almost wholly to his students and patients. He was described as the type of doctor who is always trying to discover the change in a piece of machinery rather than one who, like his contemporary Benjamin Guy Babington, regarded his patients as suffering, sensitive human beings.

Death
Thomas Addison suffered from many episodes of marked depression. It seems certain that depression contributed to his retirement in 1860. He wrote then to his medical students as follows: "A considerable breakdown in my health has scared me from the anxieties, responsibilities, and excitement of my profession; whether temporarily or permanently cannot yet be determined but, whatever may be the issue, be assured that nothing was better calculated to soothe me than the kind interest manifested by the pupils of Guy's Hospital during the many trying years devoted to that institution."

Three months later, on 29 June 1860, he committed suicide. The day after his death, the Brighton Herald recorded that: 

He was buried in the churchyard of Lanercost Priory in Cumbria. The hospital had a bust made of him, named a hall of the new part of the hospital for him, and perpetuated his memory with a marble wall table in the chapel.

Diseases Addison described
Addison is known today for describing a remarkably wide range of diseases. His name has entered into the annals of medicine  and is part of the name of a number of medical disorders, including:

 Addison's disease, sometimes called bronze skin disease, is the progressive destruction of the adrenal glands with the result being deficiency of secretion of adrenocortical hormones. Addison described this condition in his 1855 publication: On the Constitutional and Local Effects of Disease of the Suprarenal Capsules.
 Addisonian crisis (or Addison's crisis) – an acute, life-threatening crisis caused by Addison's disease
 Addisonism – a set of symptoms resembling Addison's disease, but not due to Addison's disease, that is, not due to any disease of the adrenal glands
 Addisonian anemia or Addison-Biermer disease – now synonymous with pernicious anemia which involves vitamin B12 deficiency, described first in 1849
Addison-Schilder syndrome is a metabolic disorder combining the characteristics of Addison’s disease (bronze skin disease) and cerebral sclerosis, also known as adrenoleukodystrophy.

Addison gave one of the first adequate accounts of appendicitis. In 1829, he published a valuable study of the actions of poisons. 
He also made seminal contributions to the recognition and understanding of many other diseases, including;
 Alibert's disease I – a skin disease characterized by pinkish patches,  bordered by a purplish halo
 Allgrove's syndrome – a congenital defect in lacrimation
 Rayer's disease – a disorder characterized by depigmented patches of skin, jaundice, and enlargement of the liver and spleen

References

Further reading

External links

 Addison's digitized works in the Iowa Digital Library
 
 
  – includes Biography
  Epitaph and gravestone at Lanercost Priory.

1793 births
1860 deaths
British endocrinologists
19th-century English medical doctors
People from Longbenton
People educated at the Royal Grammar School, Newcastle upon Tyne
Alumni of the University of Edinburgh Medical School
Alumni of King's College London
Suicides by jumping in England
Burials in Cumbria
Physicians of Guy's Hospital
1860s suicides